The 2008–09 European Challenge Cup pool stage was the opening stage of the 13th season of the European Challenge Cup, the second-tier competition for European rugby union clubs. It began on 9 October 2008 when RC Toulon hosted Northampton Saints and ended with two games on 25 January 2009.

Twenty teams participated in this phase of the competition; they were divided into five pools of four teams each, with each team playing the others home and away. Competition points were earned using the standard bonus point system. The five pool winners and the best three runners-up advanced to the knockout stage. These teams then competed in a single-elimination tournament that ended with the final at the Twickenham Stoop in London on 22 May 2009.

Results
The draw for the pool stages took place on 23 June 2008. The draw was conducted using the ERC European Ranking system which was based on the qualified teams' performances and participation in the Heineken Cup and knock-out stages of the European Challenge Cup over the past four seasons.

All times are local to the game location.

{| class="wikitable"
|+ Key to colours
|-
| style="background: #ccffcc;" |     
| Winner of each pool, advance to quarterfinals. Seed # in parentheses
|-
| style="background: #ccccff;" |     
| Three highest-scoring second-place teams advance to quarterfinals. Seed # in parentheses
|}

Pool 1

Pool 2

Pool 3

Pool 4

Pool 5

Seeding and runners-up

See also
European Challenge Cup
2008–09 Heineken Cup

References

pool stage
2008-09